The 1980 European Judo Championships were the 3rd edition of the European Judo Championships, and were held in Vienna, Austria on 18 May 1980.

Medal overview

Men

Medal table

Results overview

Men

60 kg

65 kg

71 kg

78 kg

86 kg

95 kg

95+ kg

Open class

References 
 Results of the 1980 European Judo Championships (JudoInside.com)

E
1980 in Austrian sport
European Judo Championships
1980s in Vienna
Sports competitions in Vienna
Judo competitions in Austria
International sports competitions hosted by Austria
May 1980 sports events in Europe